Figure in a Landscape is the seventh studio album by English singer and musician John Waite, which was released by Gold Circle Records in 2001.

Background
Figure in a Landscape followed Waite's 1997 album When You Were Mine, which had failed to achieve commercial success and did not receive full support from its label, Mercury. While living in Los Angeles, Waite accepted a record deal offered by Norm Waitt of Gold Circle Records. Waite then began recording Figure in a Landscape, which saw him continue to work closely with guitarist Shane Fontayne, who had contributed to Waite's last two albums. Prior to recording Figure in a Landscape, Waite embarked on a pre-studio tour.

The album was approached by Waite as a way of "getting back to basics". Speaking to Billboard in 2001, Waite said of the album, "It brought me back to the music, and it eliminated everything else. It reminded me of why I was in this business in the first place. I got a refresher course in why I'm John Waite." Waite also recalled for his official website, "Making the record was slower than I was used to. The songs were strong and I had Shane so I focused on the vibe, not the clock."

"Keys to Your Heart" was released as the album's lead single. Waite said of the song to The Weekender in 2001, "I think that song is just my version of saying everything is OK and that we should just relax and have a great time this summer." The second and final single, "Fly", peaked at No. 27 on the Billboard Adult Contemporary chart in December 2001. To promote the album, Waite embarked on a tour with Journey and Peter Frampton.

Critical reception

Doug Stone of AllMusic considered the album to attempt a "mature, adult contemporary atmosphere", but felt it "comes across as competent, countrified ennui" instead. He praised some of the tracks such as "Keys to Your Heart", "NYC Girl", "Thinking About You" and "Godhead", but felt some of the other songs were "yawners".

Track listing

Personnel 
 John Waite – lead and backing vocals
 Chuck Kentis – keyboards, programming
 Shane Fontayne – electric guitars, acoustic guitar, 6-string bass, backing vocals
 Don Kirkpatrick – electric guitars, acoustic guitar
 Anthony Krizan – guitars, backing vocals
 Lance Morrison – bass (1-4, 6, 8-11)
 Donnie Nossov – bass (5, 7)
 Jonathan Dresel – drums, percussion
 Debby Holiday – harmony vocals (5, 7, 10)

Production 
 Steve Barri – executive producer 
 Shiva Baum – associate executive producer
 John Waite – producer 
 Ed Thacker – producer
 Chuck Kentis – additional production (2, 3)
 Shane Fontayne – additional production (6, 9)
 Rob Dillman – production supervisor
 Derek Englund – engineer 
 Chris Reynolds – engineer 
 Jeff Thomas – engineer
 Henry Reth – assistant engineer
 Stephen Marcussen – mastering
 Nicholas Zurcher – photography
 Phillip Kovac – management

References

2001 albums
John Waite albums